Montreuil-sur-Thérain is a railway station located in the commune of Montreuil-sur-Thérain in the Oise department, France.  The station is served by TER Hauts-de-France trains from Creil to Beauvais.

References

Railway stations in Oise